Henry County is a county located in the U.S. state of Iowa. As of the 2020 census, the population was 20,482. The county seat is Mount Pleasant. The county was named for General Henry Dodge, governor of Wisconsin Territory.

History
Henry County was formed on December 7, 1836, under the jurisdiction of Wisconsin Territory, and became a part of Iowa Territory when the Iowa Territory was formed on July 4, 1838. It was named for General Henry Dodge.

The county's first courthouse was built in 1839–1840. A larger courthouse was built in 1871, and the present courthouse was raised in the twentieth century, being placed into service on August 4, 1914.

Geography

Major highways
 U.S. Highway 34
 U.S. Highway 218/Iowa Highway 27
 Iowa Highway 16
 Iowa Highway 78

Transit
 Mount Pleasant station
 List of intercity bus stops in Iowa

Adjacent counties
Washington County  (north)
Louisa County  (northeast)
Des Moines County  (east)
Lee County  (south)
Van Buren County  (southwest)
Jefferson County  (west)

Demographics

2020 census
There were 8,398 housing units, of which 7,746 were occupied.

2010 census
There were 8,280 housing units, of which 7,666 were occupied.

2000 census

As of the census of 2000, there were 20,336 people, 7,626 households, and 5,269 families residing in the county. The population density was 47 people per square mile (18/km2). There were 8,246 housing units at an average density of 19 per square mile (7/km2). The racial makeup of the county was 94.78% White, 1.49% Black or African American, 0.24% Native American, 1.88% Asian, 0.02% Pacific Islander, 0.52% from other races, and 1.07% from two or more races. 1.26% of the population were Hispanic or Latino of any race.

There were 7,626 households, out of which 32.80% had children under the age of 18 living with them, 57.70% were married couples living together, 8.20% had a female householder with no husband present, and 30.90% were non-families. 26.80% of all households were made up of individuals, and 12.20% had someone living alone who was 65 years of age or older. The average household size was 2.46 and the average family size was 2.98.

In the county, the population was spread out, with 24.70% under the age of 18, 9.00% from 18 to 24, 29.20% from 25 to 44, 22.50% from 45 to 64, and 14.70% who were 65 years of age or older. The median age was 37 years. For every 100 females there were 102.50 males. For every 100 females age 18 and over, there were 102.80 males.

The median income for a household in the county was $39,087, and the median income for a family was $46,985. Males had a median income of $31,801 versus $23,075 for females. The per capita income for the county was $18,192.  About 6.70% of families and 8.80% of the population were below the poverty line, including 10.30% of those under age 18 and 9.30% of those age 65 or over.

Communities

Cities

Coppock
Hillsboro
Mount Pleasant
New London
Olds
Rome
Salem
Wayland
Westwood
Winfield

Unincorporated communities

Lowell (CDP)
Mount Union (CDP)
Oakland Mills
Swedesburg (CDP)
Tippecanoe
Trenton (CDP)

Townships

 Baltimore
 Canaan
 Center
 Jackson
 Jefferson
 Marion
 New London
 Salem
 Scott
 Tippecanoe
 Trenton
 Wayne

Population ranking
The population ranking of the following table is based on the 2020 census of Henry County.

† county seat

Politics
Henry County is one of the most Republican counties in Iowa. It has backed Democratic Party candidates in only five elections for president from 1880 to the present.

Education
School districts include:
 Danville Community School District
 Fairfield Community School District
 Fort Madison Community School District
 Mount Pleasant Community School District
 New London Community School District
 Van Buren County Community School District
 Waco Community School District
 Winfield-Mount Union Community School District

Former school districts:
 Harmony Community School District

See also

National Register of Historic Places listings in Henry County, Iowa

References

External links

County website
Henry County Tourism
Winfield Historical Society & Museum

 
1836 establishments in Wisconsin Territory
Populated places established in 1836